There are four grading systems (or scales) in Greece – four different GPA – one for higher education, one for secondary education, and two for primary education (grades 3 to 4 and 5 to 6).

Primary school 

In 1st and 2nd grades in Greek primary schools there is only descriptive evaluation, with no grades included. In the 3rd and 4th grade grades are only letters (Α–Δ) and in 5th and 6th grades numbers ranging from 1–10 are used.

Third and fourth grade

Fifth and sixth grade

Secondary school

The 20-point grading system's range is widened in secondary school.

Gymnasium

Lyceum
The Lyceum school has 32–35 hours per week, with 20-point grading system, Law 4610/2019 The Apolytirio certificate qualification receives an additional final mention (level of distinction) with which it has been earned.

Universities and polytechnics

 Universities (public): 4FT years (except medicine schools which are 6FT years) (full-time)
 Polytechnics – Pharmacy School (public): 5FT years (full-time)
 Scale: 0.00 – 10.00 (0–100%)
 Pass (module): 5.00 (50%)

The table below depicts the Greek Grading system while illustrates approximately how the Grades are compared with ECTS, US and UK grades:

For the National Technical University of Athens (polytechnic) the above grades are different:
9–10 is "excellent", 
7–9 is "very good", 
5–7 is "good", 
0–4.9 is "fail".

Depending on the school, grade inflation in Greece is rare and it is not uncommon for an examination to be failed—or passed with grade 5—by the vast majority students. Most of the degrees can be equivalent to a bachelor's degree with honours BSc(Hons) / BEng (Hons) since all courses are 4 to 5 years and most of them professionally accredited. 
All modules, from all years, must be passed with a minimum grade of 5.00 (50%) in order for a degree to be assessed/awarded and there is currently no limit in resits. 
The classification (Ἀριστα, Λίαν Καλὠς, Καλὠς) is derived from the overall credit-weighted average for all modules including the 'diplomatiki' (university/polytechnic) or 'ptichiaki' (TEI). (dissertation/project)
 Common regulations for the award of Honours in UK

See also
Institutions of Highest Education in Greece
Apolytirio and Panhellenic examinations
Polytechnics in Greece
Education in Greece

Notes
a.  'Δ' grade is used for students who are experiencing serious learning difficulties. For these students aided teaching programs are implemented.
b.  '1–4' grades are used for students who are experiencing serious learning difficulties. For these students aided teaching programs are implemented.
c.  varies from institution to institution according to their regulations
d.  varies from institution to institution according to their regulations

References

Greece
Grading
Grading